Charles Joseph Margiotti (April 9, 1891August 25, 1956) was a nationally prominent Pennsylvania lawyer who twice served as state attorney general.

Background

Margiotti was born the son of Joseph and Fortunata Recca Margiotti.  His undergraduate education was at the Indiana Normal School (1912), and his law school education was at the University of Pennsylvania (1915).

Career

In 1934, Margiotti ran for the Republican nomination for state governor and lost to Attorney General William A. Schnader. He then switched parties and successfully supported George Earle, who then appointed him as Schnader's successor as attorney general.

In 1935, Margiotti was appointed state attorney general by Earle. Margiotti prosecuted a number of graft cases involving Earle's administration. Margiotti himself was accused of arranging excessive tax collection fees for his own law firm and sued The Philadelphia Inquirer for libel over their coverage.

In 1938, Margiotti ran for the Democratic nomination for state governor. He campaigned on the issue that the Earle administration was corrupt, and Earle dismissed him.  Margiotti lost the nomination to Charles Alvin Jones.  This time, Margiotti did not switch parties.

In September 1948, Margiotti joined former CIO general counsel Lee Pressman in testing the campaign-expenditures provision of the Taft-Hartley Act.  Pressman and Margiotti each received $37,500 for their services – a fee CIO President Philip Murray called "outrageous, even for Standard Oil".

In 1950, Margiotti was appointed again as state attorney general by Republican Governor Jim Duff, a personal friend. The incoming 1951 governor, Republican John Fine, in submitting his Cabinet nominees for approval to the General Assembly, left the attorney general position blank, as he intending to retain Margiotti without giving the General Assembly a chance to reject him. The Democrats responded by blocking all Cabinet appointments in protest against Margiotti, and after a six-week standoff, Margiotti resigned.

Prominent cases

Margiotti was the prosecutor in the murder trial of Irene Schroeder.

Margiotti successfully defended Senator James J. Davis, who had been accused of running a lottery by mail on behalf of the Loyal Order of Moose.

Margiotti successfully defended federal judge Albert Williams Johnson and others who had been accused of conspiracy to sell justice.

References

Further reading

External links
  Pennsylvania historical marker, identifying his cemetery

1891 births
1956 deaths
People from Punxsutawney, Pennsylvania
Indiana University of Pennsylvania alumni
University of Pennsylvania Law School alumni
Pennsylvania Attorneys General
Pennsylvania Republicans
Pennsylvania Democrats
20th-century American politicians
American people of Italian descent